Jawty is part of the name of two villages, both located in Gmina Susz, within Iława County, Warmian-Masurian Voivodeship, Poland:

Lubnowy Małe
Lubnowy Wielkie